The 2009 Star Mazda Championship was the eleventh season of the Star Mazda Championship, an open wheel auto racing series that competes using spec chassis and engines. It consisted of a 13-race schedule beginning in March and ending in October. For the first time since 2006, the series featured races on oval tracks, more precisely the Milwaukee Mile and the Iowa Speedway. The remaining races except the one at Virginia were held jointly with the also Mazda-backed Atlantic Championship. In addition to the main championship that is typically tested by young, developing drivers, there were also additional class titles for senior drivers.

Adam Christodoulou won the championship ahead of Peter Dempsey, after the Irish driver's retirement at the final round at Mazda Raceway Laguna Seca gifted the title to the Briton. Chris Cumming and Michael Guasch won class titles for older drivers.

Teams and Drivers

Race calendar and results

Championship standings

Overall

Expert (age 30–44)

Masters (age 45 and older)

Note: Expert and Masters classes have different point system than the overall championship.

References

External links
 Star Mazda Championship Official website

Star Mazda Championship
Indy Pro 2000 Championship